= Chinchghar =

Village in Maharashtra

- Village
- Interactive map of Chinchghar
- Country: India
- State: Maharashtra

Chinchghar is a small village in Ratnagiri district, Maharashtra state in Western India. The 2011 Census of India recorded a total of 1,534 residents in the village. The geographical area of Chinchghar is 602 hectares (1,490 acres).
